The 2003–04 NBA season was the Rockets' 37th season in the National Basketball Association, and their 33rd season in the city of Houston.  The season saw the Rockets move their home games from Compaq Center to the new Toyota Center. During the offseason, the Rockets hired head coach Jeff Van Gundy, who is best known for his tenure with the New York Knicks, and signed free agent Jim Jackson. Midway through the season, they signed free agent point guard Mark Jackson. The Rockets finished fifth in the Midwest Division with a 45–37 record, and qualified for the playoffs for the first time since 1999 as the number 7 seed in the Western Conference. Second-year star Yao Ming and Steve Francis were both selected for the 2004 NBA All-Star Game. However, the Rockets were eliminated from the first round of the playoffs by the Los Angeles Lakers, who added Karl Malone and Gary Payton to join Shaquille O'Neal and Kobe Bryant, in five games. This also marked Francis' only playoff appearance in his career. Following the season, he was traded along with Cuttino Mobley and Kelvin Cato to the Orlando Magic, and Mark Jackson retired.

For the season, the team sported new uniforms and a new logo, they remained in used until 2019.

Offseason

NBA Draft

Roster

Regular season

Season standings

Record vs. opponents

Game log

Playoffs

|- align="center" bgcolor="#ffcccc"
| 1
| April 17
| @ L.A. Lakers
| L 71–72
| Steve Francis (18)
| Jim Jackson (12)
| Steve Francis (5)
| Staples Center18,997
| 0–1
|- align="center" bgcolor="#ffcccc"
| 2
| April 19
| @ L.A. Lakers
| L 84–98
| Yao Ming (21)
| Steve Francis (10)
| Steve Francis (12)
| Staples Center18,997
| 0–2
|- align="center" bgcolor="#ccffcc"
| 3
| April 23
| L.A. Lakers
| W 102–91
| Steve Francis (27)
| Jackson, Yao (10)
| Steve Francis (7)
| Toyota Center18,226
| 1–2
|- align="center" bgcolor="#ffcccc"
| 4
| April 25
| L.A. Lakers
| L 88–92 (OT)
| Steve Francis (17)
| Jim Jackson (20)
| Steve Francis (9)
| Toyota Center18,219
| 1–3
|- align="center" bgcolor="#ffcccc"
| 5
| April 28
| @ L.A. Lakers
| L 78–97
| Jim Jackson (17)
| Kelvin Cato (12)
| Steve Francis (5)
| Staples Center18,997
| 1–4
|-

Player statistics

Season

Playoffs

Awards and records
Yao Ming, All-NBA Third Team

Transactions

References

See also
2003–04 NBA season

Houston Rockets seasons